Open iT, Inc. is an independent software vendor that specializes in metering, analyzing, and optimizing usage of critical IT assets. It was founded in 1999 by Eistein Fosli, who obtained his Master of Science in Information Technology from the University of Oslo.

Open iT originally started in Oslo, Norway, and has its main offices in Houston (Texas, US), Oslo (Norway), and Lucena City (Philippines). The company's main operations are in North America, Europe, and Asia.

Products 

Open iT Suite of IT asset management tools meter and report on usage of applications, servers, storage, databases and services across an entire organization, from a total enterprise view down to each individual user. It is built on a client/server infrastructure and includes reporting tool mechanisms.

Collected data is periodically sent to the Open iT Core Server, where it is processed and stored. Two types of reporting tools, the Open iT Reporting Server and the Open iT Analysis Server, may then pick up these stored data to generate customizable reports on a web browser.

Modules
The Open iT Software Suite has 6 modules. These are LicenseAnalyzer, LicenseOptimizer, ApplicationTracker, SystemAnalyzer, StorageAnalyzer, and UsageAnalyzer.

LicenseAnalyzer 
Open iT LicenseAnalyzer is a software usage metering and optimization tool used for managing software licenses. This module provides an enterprise-wide view of software license usage, allowing companies to align purchases and maintenance with user needs. There are more than 30 license managers that are being supported such as Abaqus / Elan, Aladdin Hardlock (NetHASP), Altair, Animator, Bentley SELECT (on local servers), Beta LM, ClearCase, Codemeter (Dongle), Dassault Systemes License Server (DSLS), EasyCopy, Encom, Enterprise Architect License Manager, EOD (Exceed onDemand), Fekete License Manager, FlexNet/FLEXlm, Gemalto License Manager, Green Hills License Manager (GHSlm), Honeywell ULM License Manager, HQMS, IBM-LUM, Jazz Team Server, LM-X, LS-DYNA, MathLM, Olicense, OrcaFlex (Orcina License Manager), Parasoft License Server, Peloton, Reprise License Manager (RLM), Sentinel HASP (NetHASP), Sentinel RMS, SlickEdit, SmartPlant, STI License Manager, Vector (Dongle), Wibukey (Dongle), etc. Some of this module's primary functions include the following:
 builds information about trends and usage patterns across an organization
 meters license usage across an enterprise
 optimizes deployment of expensive license resources
 minimizes the cost of purchasing licenses
 generate license usage reports for chargeback accounting

ApplicationTracker 
Open iT ApplicationTracker is a software asset management solution that monitors activity levels of all applications on Windows, Unix and Linux platforms.

ApplicationTracker has advanced reporting capabilities and enables tracking of software usage, independent of licensing method, allowing companies to manage even wider selections of expensive software, such as CATIA, MATLAB, Solidworks, ANSYS, MATLAB, AutoCAD, ArcGIS, Autodesk, ESRI, Dassault Systemes Software Suite and many others. ApplicationTracker generates reports showing detailed usage of CPU and elapsed time, keyboard, mouse and I/O usage, portraying each application, where and when it is running, and who is running it.

LicenseOptimizer 
Open iT LicenseOptimizer monitors several applications’ activity levels on Windows, UNIX, and Linux platforms. Some of this module's primary functions include the following:
 optimizes license usage by disabling unused applications
 disables and recalls licenses for others to use
 allows a license to be reinstated into the program when a license becomes available

SystemAnalyzer 
Open iT SystemAnalyzer is a software module for those who require better control of their software and hardware resources. Some of this module's primary functions include the following:
 provides necessary computer usage statistics, e.g. what applications are running, how long an application is running, who is running the application (user), and what the application's host(s) is/are.

StorageAnalyzer 
Open iT StorageAnalyzer delivers an overview of disk and backup data so managers can improve data storage management. Some of this module's primary functions include the following:
 provides valuable information about disk usage
 shows how full each device is
 delivers storage trend reports
 plans storage management
 enables the accounting of NetApp files’ setup and use of quotas

UsageAnalyzer 
Open iT UsageAnalyzer tracks each user's keyboard and mouse activities enabling personalized user training. Some of this module's primary functions include the following:
 collects data on keyboard and mouse activities
 provides information on whether an application is really being used or just kept open
 helps analyze an application based on its User Interface components

Point Solutions

Analyzer for ANSYS® Software 
Open iT Analyzer for ANSYS Software helps ANSYS users manage their resources investment and ensures maximum utilization and ROI of these valuable assets.

It provides a rich set of enterprise-wide software usage reports and powerful real-time views of current usage so managers can easily see how their IT assets are being used across the organization.

Analyzer for Autodesk® Licensing 
Open iT Analyzer for Autodesk Licensing helps cut software license costs and reduce wastage on license usage by monitoring activity levels of all Autodesk applications regardless of licensing type.

Server Extension

LicensePredictor 
LicensePredictor is a forecasting tool designed to help organizations in decision making, proper planning and allocation of IT resources by providing essential inputs regarding their projected software license usage over the next 18 months. It also detects and alerts users of possible data anomalies, which is key in maintaining system integrity.

Development 
Open iT Software Suite supports almost all Windows and UNIX platforms. These include but are not limited to AIX (Advanced Interactive eXecutive), Solaris, HP-UX, Linux, Windows 7, Windows Server 2008, Windows Server 2012,  Windows Server 2016, Windows 8, and Windows 10. LicenseAnalyzer also runs on Windows Phone and Android (operating system).

Supported License Managers 
Open iT Software Suite supports several License Managers. These include Abaqus / Elan, Aladdin Hardlock (NetHASP), Altair, Animator, Bentley SELECT (on local servers), Beta LM, ClearCase, Codemeter (Dongle), Dassault Systemes License Server (DSLS), EasyCopy, Encom, Enterprise Architect License Manager, EOD (Exceed onDemand), Fekete License Manager, FlexNet/FLEXlm, Gemalto License Manager, Green Hills License Manager (GHSlm), Honeywell ULM License Manager, HQMS, IBM-LUM, Jazz Team Server, LM-X, LS-DYNA, MathLM, Olicense, OrcaFlex (Orcina License Manager), Parasoft License Server, Peloton, Reprise License Manager (RLM), Sentinel HASP (NetHASP), Sentinel RMS, SlickEdit, SmartPlant, STI License Manager, Vector (Dongle), Wibukey (Dongle) and other license manager can be added on request.

Clients 
Most of Open iT's customers are listed Fortune Global 500 companies. These include BHP, Cairn Energy, General_Electric, ConocoPhillips, Ecopetrol, EP Energy, Freeport-McMoRan, Landmark Graphics Corporation/Halliburton, Maersk Oil and Gas, Marathon Oil Corporation, Murphy Oil Corporation, Pemex, Pluspetrol, Shell, Statoil, TNK – BP, Woodside Petroleum, Avio, Lockheed Martin/US Army ARL, Oshkosh, UTC Goodrich, Mitsubishi Motors Corporation, Autoliv, Calsonic Kansei, Mazda Motor Corporation, Elpida Memory, Inc. and Seagate Technology.

See also
License manager
Software licensing audit
Software asset management
IT asset management
IT Chargeback and Showback

References
Hoffman, T (2006). "Squeezing Dollars from Maintenance", http://www.computerworld.com.au/article/171131/squeezing_dollars_from_maintenance/?pp=3
Kristiansen, T (2010)."Lean and Green IT", http://www.itassetmanagement.net/2010/05/06/lean-green/
Kristiansen, T (2010)."Six Strategies for Sustainable IT", http://www.itassetmanagement.net/2010/11/18/strategies-sustainable-it/

External links 
 Open iT Official Website

System administration
Web applications
Companies based in Houston
Software companies based in Texas
Software companies of the United States